Lt. Colonel Herbert Obi-Eze was appointed Military Administrator of Anambra State in Nigeria in August 1990 during the military regime of General Ibrahim Babangida.  During his tenure, Enugu State was split off from Anambra on 27 August 1991, with Obi-Eze continuing as governor of Enugu State.
He handed over power to the elected civilian governor of Enugu State, Okwesilieze Nwodo in January 1992.

In 2007, he was head of the Imo State Security Committee.

References

Nigerian Army officers
Living people
Governors of Anambra State
Governors of Enugu State
Year of birth missing (living people)